Life is the sixth studio album by Bahamian folk musician Exuma, released in 1973 through Kama Sutra Records.

Reception
A reviewer for Billboard wrote of the album: "For sheer drive and power one would be hard pressed to meet Exuma's equal." Lynn Van Matre of the Chicago Tribune called Life Exuma's "most 'commercial' album to date", while also noting, "It still manages to be different—a commodity in precious short supply these days."

Track listing

Personnel
Adapted from the album's liner notes.

 Exuma (The Obeah Man) – lead vocals, choral vocals, "mouth mason", "throat thompson", guitar, cowbell, bugle, goat skin drums, trumpet, whistle
 Ouimungie Pappa Legra (Michael O'Neil) – C melody saxophone, tenor saxophone, conga drums, choral vocals, whistle, claves
 Kester Smith – set drums
 Kurt Nurse – steel pan, timbales
 Kenny Aaronson – electric bass
 Duke Clemons – upright bass (on "You Can't Always Get What You Want")
 Patti Bown – piano, celesta
 Jeff Smith – saxophone (on "Viva El Matador")
 Tyrone Demmons – trumpet (on "Viva El Matador")
 Bryan Maday – drums (on "If It Feels Good, Do It" and "Paint It Black")
 Steve Love – electric guitar, sitar (on "If It Feels Good, Do It" and "Paint It Black")
 Kenny Bichel – piano (on "If It Feels Good, Do It" and "Paint It Black")
 Richie Wise – tambourine (on "If It Feels Good, Do It")
 Priscilla Rollins – choral vocals (on "If It Feels Good, Do It")

References

1973 albums
Exuma (musician) albums
Kama Sutra Records albums